Cedric Hay Sloane (19 October 1915 – 6 February 1992) was an Australian cross-country skier who competed in the 1950s. At the 1952 Winter Olympics in Oslo, he finished 75th in the 18 km event and competed in the 50 km event, but did not finish.  He attended The Geelong College between 1928 and 1934.

See also
 Australia at the 1952 Winter Olympics
 The Ice Dream

References

External links
18 km Olympic cross country results: 1948-52
Olympic 50 km cross country skiing results: 1948-64

Australian male cross-country skiers
Olympic cross-country skiers of Australia
Cross-country skiers at the 1952 Winter Olympics
1992 deaths
1915 births
20th-century Australian people